Karin Palgutová (born 12 February 1993) is a Slovak female volleyball player. She is part of the Slovakia women's national volleyball team. She competed at the 2019 Women's European Volleyball Championship.

Clubs
  ŠŠK Bilíkova Bratislava (2006–2009)
  Doprastav Bratislava (2009–2012)
  St. John's University (2012–2016)
  Volley Lugano (2016–2017)
  Quimper Volley 29 (2017–2019)
  Vandoeuvre Nancy Volley-Ball (2019–present)

References

External links 

 Profile on FIVB
 Profile on CEV

1993 births
Living people
Slovak women's volleyball players
Sportspeople from Bratislava
Slovak expatriate sportspeople in France
Slovak expatriate sportspeople in Switzerland